Shōgo Shimada may refer to:

 Shōgo Shimada (actor)
 Shogo Shimada (footballer)